Brigadier Ian Douglas Langford,  & Two Bars (born 15 February 1975) is a retired senior officer of the Australian Army. He is a Distinguished Graduate of the United States Marine Corps Command and Staff College and the School of Advanced Warfighting. Langford was the Director General Future Land Capability for the Australian Army from 2018 until 2022; and previous to that was the acting head of Land Capability. He served as commanding officer of 2nd Commando, in which role he lead combat operations in Timor Leste, Afghanistan, Bougainville, Solomon Islands, Iraq, Israel, Lebanon, Syria, and the South-West Pacific; with command of Special Operations Command in Afghanistan. For his service, Langford was awarded the Distinguished Service Cross on three occasions – the only person to date to receive that honour.

Early life and education
Langford was born in Liverpool, New South Wales, to a military family, moving schools frequently. He enlisted in the army immediately after completing high school in Victoria.

He returned to tertiary studies frequently in his military career; researching, teaching and writing. Langford graduated with a bachelor's degree to the Infantry Corps from the Royal Military College in 1995, having been awarded the Sword of Honour.

Langford went on to study management at Southern Cross University (2001) followed by a Master of Arts from Deakin University (2005) a Master of Defence Studies (2009) and a Master of Strategic Studies (2010) from  the US Marine Corps War College and the School of Advanced Warfighting in Quantico, USA in 2009–10.

Langford has participated in post graduate studies at the Harvard Kennedy School. In 2020, he was made a Doctor of Philosophy by Deakin University.

Military career

Peacekeeping missions
After graduation from Duntroon in 1995, Langford was posted to 1st Battalion, Royal Australian Regiment for four years, then moved to the commando element, 4 RAR. As a young Lieutenant, he was deployed to Rifle Company Butterworth and later the Solomon Islands.

On promotion to captain in 2002, Langford served as Deputy Operations Officer in the peacekeeping mission, Operation Bel Isi II in Bougainville. Returning to 4 RAR (Cdo) as Operations Officer, Langford organised sub-units in preparation for Operation Bastille in Iraq.

In 2004, Langford was appointed Aide-de-camp to Special Operations Commander Duncan Lewis, and deployed in 2005 to the United Nations Truce Supervision Organization in Israel, Lebanon and Syria.

Command in special forces

Having been promoted to the rank of Major, Langford became the officer commanding for 4 RAR (Cdo), a special forces unit, from 2006 to 2007, deploying his Commando Company Group to Timor-Leste for Operation Astute, then to the South-West Pacific evacuation in Operation Quickstep.

Langford served in combat operations as the CCG Commander for the Third Phase of Operation Slipper in Afghanistan, known as Rotation IV. For his "command and leadership in action as Officer Commanding Alpha Commando Company Group" Colonel Langford was awarded the Distinguished Service Cross (DSC) in 2008.

Following studies in the United States and promotion to Lieutenant Colonel, Langford was appointed acting Commanding Officer of 2nd Commando Regiment.

Langford returned to Afghanistan in 2011, serving as the Plans Officer at Special Operations HQ and commanded the Special Operations Task Group in Afghanistan 2012–13. For his service, he was awarded a Bar to his DSC in the 2014 Australia Day Honours, as Lieutenant Colonel I. After it was reported that members of this rotation could be the subject of alleged war crimes in the Brereton Report, Langford attempted to hand back his medal, but was prevented from doing so.

Langford became the Staff Officer for Strategy in the Directorate of Army Research and Analysis before being selected to command the 2nd Commando Regiment, including a further deployment to Iraq as CO SOTG-Iraq. This service was recognised with a promotion to full Colonel; and with a Second Bar to his DSC in early 2016, "for distinguished leadership in warlike operations as part of a Special Operations Force on Operation Okra from September 2014 to February 2015."

Army planning roles

Away from combat, his identity no longer suppressed, Langford began researching, teaching and presenting from 2016. In one presentation Langford stressed the crucial nature of leadership when it comes to regulating battlefield behaviour in the profession of arms:“Situational ethics are highly contextual and drift will occur without one transformational factor, and that’s leadership. Leadership is the action … that keeps that kind of behaviour within the bounds of what is lawful, what is ethical and what is moral.”From 2017, Langford served as director of the Chief of Army’s select internal think tank, known as Strategic Initiatives Group.

By December 2018, Langford was a Brigadier in the role of Director-General of Future Land Warfare, Army Headquarters. In this role he established an office to explore robotic and autonomous systems, to give the army a "capability edge."

In February 2019, Brigadier Ian Langford gave a lecture titled ‘Accelerated Warfare' a military concept that would accelerate "the velocity of the engagements beyond the speed at which the enemy can target, and precisely execute and comprehend the events unfolding."

By 2022, Langford was described as "one of the army's most respected and decorated leaders." However, by October of that year it was reported that he had "voluntarily discharged" after falling out of favour with the Chief of Defence. There was some conjecture this was connected to an alleged lack of oversight of soldiers when had command of special forces, however, the report in The Age indicated this was unfounded, reporting that Langford had "no involvement in or knowledge of any war crimes which may have taken place."

The resignation was described as "a massive loss" to the Australian Defence Force, since he had been a military leader in the mould of American Admiral William H. McRaven; "super smart, strategic  and widely respected." Langford had served under McRaven during his time at NATO Special Operations Component Command-Afghanistan. He now consults on national security and military strategy, regarded as an expert in this field.

Honours and awards

References

1975 births
Australian brigadiers
Australian military personnel of the Iraq War
Australian military personnel of the War in Afghanistan (2001–2021)
Deakin University alumni
Living people
Marine Corps War College alumni
Recipients of the Distinguished Service Cross (Australia)
Royal Military College, Duntroon graduates
Southern Cross University alumni